The list of University of Maine people includes notable graduates, former students, faculty, and presidents of the University of Maine.

Arts, literature, humanities, and entertainment 
Doris Twitchell Allen, Children's International Summer Villages founder
Lawrence Bender, film producer (Pulp Fiction and Good Will Hunting)
Will Bonsall, American author, seed saver and veganic farmer
Donald DePoy, Classes of 1994/1996, bluegrass musician, music educator, and music event organizer.
Nick Di Paolo, Class of 1984, stand-up comedian, actor, writer, and podcaster
Biff Elliot, actor and sportscaster
Chad Finn, sportswriter
Clarine Coffin Grenfell, Class of 1932, author and poet
Rick Hautala, Class of 1970, author
Donald Holder, Class of 1980, Tony-winning Broadway lighting designer ("The Lion King")
Stephen King, Class of 1970, author
Tabitha King, Class of 1971, author
Nick DiPaolo, Class of 1984, comedian 
Tina Passman, classical scholar
Mildred Brown Schrumpf, Class of 1925, Maine food educator and columnist
Brad Sullivan, actor
Rudy Vallée, Attended 1921–1922, Jazz singer and pop star of the 1920s
Timothy Simons, Class of 2001, Actor and comedian best known for his role as Jonah Ryan on the HBO television series Veep
Paul Theroux, American author

Politics 
Albert E. Anderson, Class of 1909, state legislator (19171918) and attorney
John Baldacci, Class of 1986, Governor of Maine (20032011)
Janet Bewley, member of the Wisconsin Legislature
Joseph E. Brennan, Governor of Maine (19791987, member of the United States House of Representatives (19871991)
Styles Bridges, Governor of New Hampshire (19351937), U.S. Senator (19371961)
Emily Cain, Class of 2002, State Legislator (20052014)
Ben Chipman, State Representative from Portland
Patricia M. Collins, two-term mayor of Caribou, Maine, and civic leader
Samuel Collins, Jr., State Senator (19741984) and Maine Supreme Court Associate Justice (19881994)
Linda Smith Dyer, J.D. 1980, lawyer, lobbyist, women's rights activist, co-founder of the Maine Women's Lobby
Matthew Dunlap, Secretary of State of Maine (20052011; 2013current)
Peter Edgecomb, State Representative from Caribou (20042012)
Keith Farnham, member of the Illinois House of Representatives (20092014)
Wallace Rider Farrington, Class of 1891, Governor of Hawai'i (19211929), founder of University of Hawai'i
Charles Harlow, member of the Maine House of Representatives (20042010)
Debra Lee Hovey, member of the Connecticut House of Representatives
Edwin F. Ladd, U.S. Senator from North Dakota (19211925)
Paul LePage, Governor of Maine (20112019)
Kenneth P. MacLeod, Class of 1940, President of the Maine Senate
John R. McKernan, Jr., Governor of Maine (19871995), member of the United States House of Representatives (19831987)
DeForest H. Perkins, Class of 1900, Superintendent of Portland Public Schools and Grand Dragon of the Maine Ku Klux Klan (19251928)
Leigh Saufley, Class of 1976, State of Maine Supreme Court Chief Justice (20012020)
Tom Saviello, Member of the Maine Senate (20112018) 
David Slagger, Member of the Maine House of Representatives representing the Maliseet people (2012)
Olympia Snowe, Class of 1969, U.S. Senator from Maine (19952013)

Military 
Dana T. Merrill, United States Army brigadier general

Business, construction, and service 
Colby Chandler, Class of 1950, former CEO, Eastman Kodak
Francis Clergue, businessman, industrialist
Maurice K. Goddard, former secretary of the Pennsylvania Department of Conservation and Natural Resources, a driving force in the creation of 45 Pennsylvania state parks during his 24 years in office.
Chandler C. Harvey, Classes of 1890/1893, newspaper publisher
Frank Knight, arborist
Patrice Oppliger, Assistant Professor of Communication, Boston University College of Communication
Robert A. Rushworth, Class of 1951, Air Force test pilot
Harold Allen Fernald, Class of 1954, publishing executive and philanthropist

Science and engineering 
Paul André Albert, Class of 1950, engineer and inventor, IBM and founder of ACI Alloys
Harold Beverage, Class of 1915, inventor, Vice President of R&D at RCA Communications
Pearce Paul Creasman, Class of 2003, Egyptologist & archaeologist; Director, University of Arizona Egyptian Expedition
Hugh Hamilton DeWitt, faculty 1969-1995 Ichthyologist, marine biologist and oceanographer 
Francis T. Crowe, Class of 1905, Civil Engineer, chief engineer of the Hoover Dam, namesake of the Francis Crowe Society
Leslie Glasgow (Class of 1948) – biologist and conservationist who was assistant Secretary of the Interior in the first Nixon administration
Leslie Holdridge, Class of 1931, botanist
Ashok Jhunjhunwala, Class of 1979, professor at IIT Madras and Padma Shri recipient
Louis LaPierre, Class of 1974, former professor of ecology who resigned from the Order of Canada after it was discovered that he had misrepresented his academic credentials
Bernard Lown, Class of 1942, Nobel Peace Prize winner
Richard Lutz, Class of 1975 – deep sea vent researcher, director of the Institute of Marine and Coastal Sciences
Francis T. McAndrew, Ph.D. 1981, Psychologist/Professor/Author
Chuck Peddle, Engineering Physics 1959, main developer of the MOS Technology 6502 microprocessor
Lore Alford Rogers, Class of 1896, USDA dairy scientist and bacteriologist
Ronald A. Roy, Engineering Physics 1981, 65th George Eastman Chaired Professor, Head of the Department of Engineering Science, University of Oxford
Robert Slocum, botanist and biologist

Sports 
Bob Beers, NHL player, Boston Bruins, Tampa Bay Lightning, Edmonton Oilers, New York Islanders; color commentator on Bruins radio broadcasts
Jovan Belcher, former linebacker for the Kansas City Chiefs.
Ben Bishop, NHL goalie,  Tampa Bay Lightning
Cindy Blodgett, basketball player in the WNBA and former women's basketball program head coach at the University of Maine
Jim Boylen, head coach, Chicago Bulls
Mike Bordick, former Major League Baseball shortstop
D'Lo Brown (born Accie Conner), professional wrestler
Mike Buck, former quarterback for the New Orleans Saints
Jack Capuano, NHL defenseman; coach of the New York Islanders
Rick Carlisle, NBA player, Dallas Mavericks coach (transferred to University of Virginia)
Dave Cloutier, former American Football League safety for the Boston Patriots.
Stephen Cooper, former linebacker for the San Diego Chargers
Scott Darling, Goalie, won the 2014–15 Stanley Cup with the Chicago Blackhawks
Niko Dimitrakos, professional ice hockey player
Mike DeVito, former defensive end for the New York Jets
Mike Dunham, former NHL player and Olympian (2002)
Mike Flynn, center, Baltimore Ravens
Brian Gaine, NFL executive
Barrett Heisten, ECHL player, Alaska Aces
Jimmy Howard, NHL goalie, Detroit Red Wings
Ben Hutton, defenseman Vancouver Canucks
Martin John, professional soccer player, full back, Cardiff City
Joe Johnson, baseball player for Atlanta Braves, Toronto Blue Jays
Paul Kariya, NHL player for St. Louis Blues, eldest Kariya brother
Steve Kariya, SEL player, Frölunda HC, middle brother of Paul and Martin
Martin Kariya, KHL player, Dinamo Riga, younger brother of Paul and Steve
Noam Laish (born 1993), Israeli basketball player
Jack Leggett, baseball head coach, Clemson University
Mike Lundin, NHL player, Tampa Bay Lightning
Brandon McGowan, defensive back, New England Patriots
Kevin McMahan, wide receiver, 2006 Mr. Irrelevant
Carl "Stump" Merrill, former manager of the New York Yankees
Greg Moore, AHL player, Hartford Wolfpack
Matthew Mulligan, tight end, Detroit Lions
Gustav Nyquist, NHL player, Detroit Red Wings
Montell Owens, former fullback for the Jacksonville Jaguars
Bill Patrick, (AKA Gerard Monteux), NBC, Versus Network announcer and columnist
Jeremy Peña, MLB player, Houston Astros
Dustin Penner, NHL player, Anaheim Ducks, Edmonton Oilers, Los Angeles Kings
Jeff Plympton, MLB, Boston Red Sox
Teddy Purcell, NHL winger, Edmonton Oilers
Viktoriya Rybalko, track-and-field long jumper
Irv Ray, MLB player, Boston Beaneaters, Baltimore Orioles
Patrick Ricard, American football player for the Baltimore Ravens
Devin Shore, Anaheim Ducks 
Garth Snow, NHL player, Colorado Avalanche, Philadelphia Flyers, Vancouver Canucks, Pittsburgh Penguins, New York Islanders; general manager of Islanders
Daren Stone, safety, Atlanta Falcons, Dallas Cowboys, Baltimore Ravens
Justin Strzelczyk, former offensive lineman for the Pittsburgh Steelers
Jeremy Swayman, NHL goaltender, Boston Bruins
Mark Sweeney, Major League Baseball outfielder
Bill Swift, former Major League Baseball pitcher
Lofa Tatupu, former NFL player and Pro Bowl linebacker, Seattle Seahawks (transferred to University of Southern California)
Larry Thomas, former Major League Baseball player
Gary Thorne ESPN sports analyst and play-by-play announcer
John Tortorella, NHL head coach, Philadelphia Flyers
Eric Weinrich, NHL player and 1988 USA Olympic hockey team member
Jim Montgomery, Head Coach, Boston Bruins
Ryan Lomberg, NHL Left Winger, Florida Panthers

Faculty and administration

Presidents
The following is a list of presidents of the University of Maine.

History
 Robert H. Babcock,
 Caroline Colvin
 Clark G. Reynolds, Professor of History (1968-1976)
 David C. Smith

Philosophy
 Douglas Allen

Other
Alvin C. Eurich, first President of the State University of New York
Eileen Farrell, opera singer
Edward D. Ives, folklorist
Colin Martindale, psychologist and author
Joanne P. McCallie, coach
H. A. Pogorzelski, mathematician
Alan Shulman, composer and cellist
Joseph W. Westphal, administrator
John Franklin Witter, veterinarian specialist in avian medicine

References

https://digitalcommons.library.umaine.edu/alumni_magazines/ Digital archive of Maine Alumnus Magazine

University of Maine people